Commisso is an Italian surname. Notable people with the surname include:

 Antonio Commisso (born 1956), Italian mobster of the Commisso 'ndrina
 Cosimo Commisso (criminal) (born 1950), Italian mobster of the Commisso 'ndrina
 Cosimo Commisso (scientist), Canadian biologist
 Cosimo Commisso (soccer), Canadian soccer player
 Emilio Commisso (born 1956), Argentine footballer
 Eduardo Commisso (born 1948), Argentine footballer
 Rocco B. Commisso (born 1949), Italian-American businessman, chairman of Mediacom Communications

See also 
 Commisso's Food Markets, former Canadian supermarket chain

Italian-language surnames